Beyoncé: Lemonade is a film and visual album executive produced by American singer Beyoncé. The film serves as a visual companion to the 2016 album of the same name. It premiered on HBO on April 23, 2016.

Premise 
The film is divided into eleven chapters, titled "Intuition", "Denial", "Anger", "Apathy", "Emptiness", "Accountability", "Reformation", "Forgiveness", "Resurrection", "Hope", and "Redemption". The film uses poetry and prose written by British-Somali poet Warsan Shire; the poems adapted were "The Unbearable Weight of Staying", "Dear Moon", "How to Wear Your Mother's Lipstick", "Nail Technician as Palm Reader", and "For Women Who Are Difficult to Love".

Cast 
The film's cast features Ibeyi, Laolu Senbanjo, Amandla Stenberg, Quvenzhané Wallis, Chloe x Halle, Zendaya and Serena Williams. In "Forward", the mothers of Trayvon Martin (Sybrina Fulton), Michael Brown (Lesley McFadden), and Eric Garner (Gwen Carr) are featured holding pictures of their deceased sons. Jay-Z and Beyoncé's daughter Blue Ivy appears in home video footage at one point, as does Jay-Z's grandmother Hattie White, and Beyoncé's mother Tina Knowles, who is shown with her second husband Richard Lawson on their wedding day in 2015.

Reception

Critical response
Miriam Bale for Billboard called Lemonade "a revolutionary work of Black feminism" as "a movie made by a black woman, starring Black women, and for Black women", in which Beyoncé is seen gathering, uniting and leading Black women throughout the film. As well as relating the story of Beyoncé's relationship with her husband, Lemonade also chronicles the relationship between Black women and American society. The includes how the United States betrayed and continually mistreats Black women, with society needing to solve its problems in order to enable reformation and the rehabilitation of Black women. As part of reverting the societal oppression and silencing of Black women, Lemonade centralizes the experiences of Black women in a way that is not often seen in the media, and celebrates their achievements despite the adversity they face.

In June 2016, Matthew Fulks sued Beyoncé, Sony Music, Columbia Records and Parkwood Entertainment for allegedly lifting nine visual elements of his short film Palinoia for the trailer for Lemonade. The lawsuit was subsequently dismissed by New York federal judge Jed S. Rakoff, siding with the defendant.

Accolades

References

External links
 

2016 films
2016 television films
2010s American films
2010s English-language films
Beyoncé
Films directed by Beyoncé
Films directed by Jonas Åkerlund
Films directed by Mark Romanek
HBO Films films